Kalangestan (also Romanized as Kolangestān but it is wrong) is a village in Taher Gurab Rural District, in the Central District of Sowme'eh Sara County, Gilan Province, Iran. At the 2006 census, its population was 851, in 246 families.

References 

Populated places in Sowme'eh Sara County